Subhrajit Sahoo (born 12 November 1988) is an Indian cricketer. He played the different formats of First-class cricket, List A cricket and T20 for the Orissa cricket team from 2009 to 2015.

References

External links
 

1988 births
Living people
Indian cricketers